Hesar-e Olya or Hesar Olya may refer to:
 Hesar-e Olya, Tehran
 Hesar-e Olya, Zanjan

See also
 Hesar-e Bala (disambiguation)